Josef Foschepoth (born 19 November 1947) is a German historian and a professor at the University of Freiburg. His research interest is the surveillance in post-WWII Germany.

Bio 
Foschepoth studied history, theology and social sciences and received his doctorate in 1975 from the Westphalian Wilhelms University in Münster with a thesis on the Reformation and the Peasants' War in the history of the GDR . After five years as a high school teacher  at the Evangelisch Stiftisches Gymnasium Gütersloh , he became a research assistant and head of the new research area "Post-War History" at the German Historical Institute in London.

After his time in London, Foschepoth returned to Germany and held leading positions as director of the Ostakademie Königstein, was Secretary General of the German Coordination Council of the Societies for Christian-Jewish Cooperation (DKR) in Frankfurt and Chief Urban Director in the cultural department of the city of Münster.  From his work at the DKR, the book In the Shadow of the Past emerged, which dealt critically with the history of the DKR.

From 1997 to 2005 Foschepoth worked for the private AKAD Private Universities GmbH, first as managing director, then later as professor and rector of the AKAD University of Economics and Social Sciences in Lahr. He was also the founding board member of the Association of Private Universities in Germany.

Selected publications

References

External links 
 Website at University of Freiburg 

1947 births
Living people
20th-century German historians
Academic staff of the University of Freiburg
20th-century German male writers
21st-century German historians
21st-century German male writers
German male non-fiction writers
University of Münster alumni
People from Werl
Historians of Germany